Raismes is a commune in the Nord department in northern France. The flutist Gaston Blanquart (1877–1962) was born in Raismes.

Raismes is known for hosting the annual rock music festival Raismes Fest.

Population

Notable residents

Pierre Pruvost (1890–1967) geologist

See also
Communes of the Nord department

References

Communes of Nord (French department)